Sevastopol is the main railway station in the city of Sevastopol in Crimea, a territory recognized by a majority of countries as part of Ukraine, but de facto under control and administration of Russia. It is the terminus of the main line Moscow–Sevastopol. The station was opened in 1875.

History
The construction of the Lozova–Sevastopol railway began in 1872 using private funds from Peter Gubonin. In 1873 the railway reached Alexandrovsk, and in 1874 it reached Simferopol. On September 15, 1875, the first train arrived in Sevastopol. As laying the line to Sevastopol required traversing difficult mountainous terrain in the area due to the Makenzijeva mountains, six tunnels were built: Rusks, Count (the shortest, at ), White, Gypsy (the longest, at ), Trinity and Urban. The last two tunnels opened at the beginning of the 21st century, are located within the city. The station building itself was constructed near the mouth of South Bay, on a formerly marshy lowland that over the years was covered by earth (and so was called "spit").

The original building was destroyed during the Great Patriotic War. The present railway building was built in 1950. Originally there was a monument to Stalin, but after the exposure of his cult of personality in the 1950s, the monument was demolished. Now there is a small fountain.

On December 27, 2014, after Russia annexed Crimea, long-distance passenger trains were suspended after Ukrainian authorities stopped all the rail connections to Mainland Ukraine, the only trains to the station are the Simferopol–Sevastopol suburban trains, 5 times a day. On December 23, 2019, the passenger trains from Saint Petersburg were launched by the newly opened route passes over the Crimean bridge.

Destinations

Major destinations

Inter-connection to Mainland Russia

References

Rail transport in Sevastopol
Railway stations in Crimea
Railway stations in the Russian Empire opened in 1875